Claudin domain-containing protein 1 is a protein that in humans is encoded by the CLDND1 gene.

References

External links

Further reading